The Place des Quinconces, located in Bordeaux, France, is among the largest city squares in Europe (approximately 63 ac or 25.6 ha).

It was laid out in 1820 on the site of Château Trompette and was intended to prevent rebellion against the city. Its guns were turned towards the centre. Its current shape (lengthened rectangle rounded off with a semicircle) was adopted in 1816. Trees were planted (in quincunxes, hence the name of the square) in 1818.

With the installation of a tram system in 2003, the place has become the most important public transport hub of the area, with Quinconces tram stop serving three tram lines, 21 bus lines (including 3 night buses), an electric shuttle, and 12 coach lines through Gironde as well as a reception area in the south.

Sculptures
The two  rostral columns facing the Garonne were erected by Henri-Louis Duhamel du Monceau in 1829. One of them symbolises commerce, and the other stands for navigation. The white-marble statues of Michel de Montaigne and Charles de Secondat, baron de Montesquieu (by sculptor Dominique Fortuné Magges]) were added in 1858.

The principal monument, the 54-meter-tall Monument aux Girondins, was erected between 1894 and 1902, in memory of the Girondists who fell victim of the Reign of Terror during the French Revolution. It has a large pedestal framed with two basins, decorated with bronze horses and troops, and surmounted by a large column with a statue on top to represent the spirit of liberty. Just below the statue on each of the 4 sides are the letter "G" for the Girondins, and crescents for the "Port de la Lune" (Port of the Moon) symbolising the crescent-shaped curve of the river.

Among the sculptures are:
 towards the large theatre: triumph of the Republic
 towards Chartrons: triumph of the Concorde
 towards the river: the Tribune with the French cockerel; to its right, History, and on its left, the Éloquence (2 seated people).
 towards the Tourny square: the city of Bordeaux sitting on the prow of a ship with a cornucopia. To the right of the base: the river Dordogne and to the left the Garonne.

At the feet of the "Triumph of the Concorde": Ignorance, Lies and Vice.  At the feet of the Triumph of the Republique": A family with the child riding on a sturgeon, representing Happiness. The column was erected by Achille Dumilatre and architect Victor Rich. The pedestal is by Corgolin.  Felix Sharpantie and Gustav Debri created the sculpture groups with the latter responsible for the sea horses.

During the 1942 German occupation of France in World War II, the Nazis removed the statues from the fountain to make cannons and destroyed other parts of the monument.  The statues were located two years later in Angers and restored and re-erected in 1983.  The Girondin memorial was  renovated in 2004 and declared a historical monument on March 16, 2011.  The names of deputies to the National Convention executed during the Terror who hailed from the Gironde department were added in 1989.

Gallery

See also 

 Place de la Concorde
 List of city squares (by size)

References

External links
Information on the city's official site 
Place des Quinconces on a city map, including photos of The Orange 

Squares in France
Buildings and structures in Bordeaux
Tourist attractions in Bordeaux
Chateau Trompette